All Souls may refer to:
 All Souls (film), a 1919 German silent film
 "All Souls" (The X-Files), an episode of The X-Files
 All Souls (TV series), a 2001 television supernatural drama
 All Souls College, Oxford
 All Souls' Day
 All Souls: A Family Story from Southie, a memoir by Michael Patrick MacDonald
 All Souls, a 1989 novel by Javier Marías
 All Souls (Schutt novel), a 2008 novel by Christine Schutt
 All Souls (album), a 2022 album by Siouxsie and the Banshees
 All Souls' Hospital, a defunct Catholic hospital in Morristown, New Jersey

See also
 All Souls Church (disambiguation)